The Sonoma Valley AVA is an American Viticultural Area in Sonoma County, California which centers on the Sonoma Valley in the southern portion of the county. The name 'Sonoma' means 'Valley of the Moon' in the local Native American dialect. The appellation is bordered by two mountain ranges: the Mayacamas Mountains to the east and the Sonoma Mountains to the west.

History 

Sonoma Valley has played a significant role in the history of California wine. The first vineyards in the valley were planted by Franciscan friars at Mission San Francisco Solano in 1823. In 1857, Agoston Haraszthy established one of California's first successful commercial wineries here when he founded Buena Vista Winery. By 1920, there were 256 wineries in Sonoma Valley with more than  planted to grape vines. Prohibition affected Sonoma Valley as hard as any other wine region in California, and most wineries were unable to continue operating. Recovery after the repeal of Prohibition in 1933 was slow, and only about 50 wineries survived.

In 1969, there were still only 58 bonded wineries in Sonoma Valley. The wine industry in the valley began to expand rapidly in the 1970s and 1980s. By 1975 some 24,000 acres (9,700 ha.) were under plantation. Official boundaries for the Sonoma Valley wine region were codified into federal law in 1981 as the eighth designated American Viticultural Area. By 2005, there were 254 wineries, and over  under vine. The wine industry annually contributes over $8 billion USD to the local economy.

Climate and geography 
The area is known for its unique terroir with Sonoma Mountain protecting the area from the wet and cool influence of the nearby Pacific Ocean. The Sonoma Mountains to the west help protect the valley from excessive rainfall. The cool air that does affect the region comes northward from San Pablo Bay through the Los Carneros region and southward from the Santa Rosa Plain.

See also 
 Sonoma County wine

References

External links
 Sonoma Valley Wine Sonoma Valley Vintners & Growers
 Sonoma Valley 

American Viticultural Areas of the San Francisco Bay Area
Sonoma Valley
Geography of Sonoma County, California
1981 establishments in California
American Viticultural Areas